The Mad Whirl is a 1925 American jazz age black-and-white silent drama film about the "loosening of youth morals" that took place during the 1920s. Written by Edward T. Lowe Jr. and Lewis Milestone, and directed by William A. Seiter for Universal Pictures, the film stars May McAvoy and Jack Mulhall. The film was released during the Prohibition era, when the sale of alcoholic drinks in the United States was banned.

Plot
Cathleen Gillis (May McAvoy) falls in love with Jack Herrington (Jack Mulhall). Martin Gillis (George Fawcett), Cathleen's loving father, is stern, very religious, and runs an ice cream shop.  Cathleen is an obedient daughter and conservative in her views as well. Jack however, has a routine that includes wild parties hosted by his parents, Gladys and John (Myrtle Stedman and Alec B. Francis), who think it is better to be their son's friend by their providing bootleg whiskey and a place to have all-night parties. Jack's lifestyle places him at odds with Cathleen's, but he promises her that he will change his ways. He backslides several times, but in the end is reformed by Cathleen's love, and they elope. After the elopement, Gladys and John get a stern lecture on temperance and sobriety from Martin and reform their ways as well.

Cast
 May McAvoy as Cathleen Gillis 
 Jack Mulhall as Jack Herrington 
 Myrtle Stedman as Gladys Herrington 
 Barbara Bedford as Margie Taylor 
 Alec B. Francis as John Herrington 
 Ward Crane as Benny Kingsley 
 George Fawcett as Martin Gillis 
 Marie Astaire as Julia Carling 
 Joseph Singleton as Spivens 
With Betty Allen, Charles King, Ellison Manners, William H. O'Brien, Rolfe Sedan, and Grady Sutton.

References

External links

1925 films
1925 drama films
American silent feature films
Silent American drama films
American black-and-white films
1920s English-language films
Films directed by William A. Seiter
Universal Pictures films
1920s American films